A chief experience officer (CXO) is an executive responsible for the overall experience of an organization's products and services. As user experience (UX) is quickly becoming a key differentiator in the modern business landscape, the CXO is charged with bringing holistic experience design to the boardroom and making it an intrinsic part of the company's strategy and culture.

Responsibilities 
A CXO's responsibilities include:
 Corporate leadership in UX strategy
 Software and hardware design management
 Creative reviews and concept development
 Intellectual property positioning and protection
In a piece in UX Magazine, Lis Hubert said the goal of having a CXO is "to have someone responsible for curating and maintaining a holistic user-, business-, and technology-appropriate experience" at the C-level. Authors Claudia Fisher and  Christine Vallaster state that a CXO or chief marketing officer is a good idea when "the brand is seen as a strategic driver of the organization."

In Healthcare 

Howard Larkin states that in healthcare, the CXO is "responsible for making sure every aspect of a complex delivery system consistently meets basic patient and human needs" and what it calls "operationalizing the patient experience mission."

Perception of title
In 2006 the New York Times discussed the role of the chief experience officer in the context of a number of other "unconventional" and "wacky" titles being created by Madison Avenue firms with the intent to "signal a realization by an advertiser or agency that in a rapidly changing marketing and media landscape, the time for the tried and true has come and gone."

The Wharton Business School has called the proliferation of roles in the C-Suite "Title Inflation", and Herman and Giola warn about the "dangerous side effects" of "job title invention".

Related positions 
In a 2012 publication, it was reported that "chief customer officer" (30%) and "chief client officer" (15%) were more commonly used for the role than "chief experience officer" (10%), with 45% utilizing other variations.

See also
 User Experience
 Experience design
 Customer experience

References

E
Management occupations